Old Ottawa East or just Ottawa East (Vieil Ottawa Est in French) is a neighbourhood in Capital Ward in central Ottawa, Ontario, Canada.  It is located south of Nicholas Street and between the Rideau Canal and the Rideau River, with Avenue Road marking the southern border.  To the south is the neighbourhood of Old Ottawa South and to the northeast is Sandy Hill.  Old Ottawa East includes the Lees Avenue area. The Flora Footbridge, which opened to pedestrians in 2019, connects the community to The Glebe.

According to the Canada 2011 Census, the population of the neighbourhood was 7,279.

This small neighbourhood was originally the suburban community of Archville that was incorporated as the village of Ottawa East in 1888.  In 1907 it was amalgamated with the growing community of Ottawa.  Running through the centre of the neighbourhood is Main Street, which was the central road of Archville, but which is not particularly central to modern Ottawa.  The neighbourhood is home to Saint Paul University, Lady Evelyn Alternative School, Au Coeur d'Ottawa elementary school, the central campus of St. Nicholas Adult High School, and Immaculata High School.

The centre of the neighbourhood is home to Greystone Village, a housing development that has been met with some objection by neighbourhood residents. The southern part of the neighbourhood is sometimes referred to as Rideau Gardens.

The Cuban embassy is located in the neighbourhood, along Main Street.

Reeves
As an independent village, Ottawa East elected a reeve (similar to a mayor) to head a village council from 1888 to 1907. The reeves of the village were as follows:
 James Ballantyne (1888-1894)
 James S. Webster (?-1898)
 Henry George Roche (1899-1902)
 Ronald M. Saunders (1903-1905)
 Robert J. Biggars (1906-1907)

Notable residents 

 Jean Chrétien, former prime minister
Paul Dewar, politician
Wallis Giunta, opera singer
 Leonard Grosvenor, hockey player
 Patsy Guzzo, hockey player and olympian
 Don Loney, football player and coach
 Arnie Morrison, football player
W.E. Noffke, architect
 Ralph St. Germain, hockey player and olympian
 Rick Vaive, hockey player

See also
List of Ottawa neighbourhoods

External links

Ottawa East Community Association
Mainstreeter - Community Newspaper

References

Neighbourhoods in Ottawa
Ottawa East
Ottawa East